Erebus is a genus of moths in the family Erebidae.

Taxonomy
The genus is the type genus of the tribe Erebini, subfamily Erebinae, and family Erebidae.

Description
Differs from Speiredonia in the mid and hind tibia being spined and almost naked. Forewings are broad.

Species
 Erebus acrotaenia (Felder, 1861)
 Erebus acuta (Fawcett, 1917)
 Erebus aerosa (Swinhoe, 1900)
 Erebus albiangulata (A. E. Prout, 1924)
 Erebus albicinctus (Kollar, 1844) (syn: Erebus obscurata (Wileman, 1923), Erebus rivularis Westwood, 1848)
 Erebus atavistis (Hampson 1913)
 Erebus candidii (Strand 1920)
 Erebus caprimulgus (Fabricius, 1775)
 Erebus clavifera (Hampson, 1913)
 Erebus crepuscularis (Linnaeus, 1758) (syn: Erebus obscura (Bethune-Baker, 1906) )
 Erebus cyclops (Felder, 1861)
 Erebus ephesperis (Hübner, 1827)
 Erebus felderi (A. E. Prout, 1922) (syn: Erebus seistosticha (A. E. Prout, 1926))
 Erebus gemmans (Guenée, 1852)
 Erebus glaucopis (Walker, 1858) (syn: Erebus prunosa (Moore, 1883))
 Erebus hieroglyphica (Drury, 1773) (syn: Erebus celebensis (Hopffer, 1874), Erebus hermonia (Cramer, 1777), Erebus lunaris (Walker, 1864), Erebus mygdonia (Cramer, 1777), Erebus tenebrata (L. B. Prout, 1919), Erebus ulula (Fabricius, 1775))
 Erebus illodes (Zerny, 1916)
 Erebus intermedia (Pagenstecher, 1900)
 Erebus ipsa (Swinhoe, 1918)
 Erebus jaintiana (Swinhoe, 1896)
 Erebus lombokensis Swinhoe, 1915
 Erebus macfarlanei (Butler, 1876)
 Erebus macrops (Linnaeus, 1768)
 Erebus maurus (Gaede, 1917)
 Erebus mirans A. E. Prout, 1932
 Erebus nyctaculis (Snellen, 1880)
 Erebus orcina (Felder and Rogenhofer, 1874)
 Erebus pilosa (Leech, 1900)
 Erebus purpurata (Druce, 1888) (syn: Erebus aroa Bethune-Baker, 1908)
 Erebus strigipennis (Moore, 1883)
 Erebus sumatrensis (Hampson, 1913)
 Erebus sumbana (Swinhoe, 1918) (syn: Erebus ceramica (Swinhoe 1918), Erebus luzonica (Swinhoe, 1918))
 Erebus superba (Swinhoe, 1908)
 Erebus terminitincta (Gaede, 1938) (syn: Erebus variegata (Swinhoe, 1900))
 Erebus variegata (Butler, 1887)
 Erebus walkeri (Butler, 1875) (syn: Erebus valceri (Hampson, 1913))

Former species
 Erebus javanensis (Hampson, 1913)
 Erebus moriola (Swinhoe, 1918)
 Erebus orion (Hampson, 1913)
 Erebus oxodoxia (Swinhoe, 1918)

References

External links
 
 Naturhistoriska Riksmuseet 

 
Erebini
Moth genera